Øyvind Berg (born 14 January 1959 is a Norwegian lyric poet, playwright, actor and translator.

Berg was born in Oslo. He studied to the intermediate level in philosophy, literature and egyptology at the University of Bergen and the University of Tromsø. He was a member of the Norwegian Authors' Union from 1987 to 1988 and 1993 to 1996. He was selected to serve on the Arts Council Norway's appeal committee for recognition of new Norwegian literature. In 1997, he was artistic director for Norwegian Festival of Literature. Berg's poetry has been translated into German, English and Danish.

Bibliography 
Retninger – poetry (1982)
Barn er et hardt språk – poetry (1984)
Vitenskap for barn – poetry (1985)
Et foranskutt lyn – poetry (1986)
Totschweigetaktiken – poetry (1988)
Kjøter: en sosiodisé – play (1989)
Lærestykker – play (1990)
Kunngjøring – poetry (1992)
Poe si tid – poetry (1993)
Forskjellig – poetry (1995)
Kjærlighetc. – poetry (1997)
Nede fortelling – poetry (2000)
Chutzpah i måneskinn – poetry, prose (2004)

Awards 
Oktoberprisen 1992
Brage Prize 1995, for Forskjellig
Norsk teaterlederforums oversetterpris 1996
Aschehoug Prize 1999
Halldis Moren Vesaas-prisen 2000
Språklig samlings litteraturpris 2002
Hold Dampen Oppe-prisen 2003
Danse- og teatersentrums Scenekunstpris 2003

References and notes

 Øyvind Berg in Norske Dramatikeres Forbund (in Norwegian)
 Øyvind Berg in NRK Forfatter (in Norwegian)
 Øyvind Berg in Dagbladet Forfatter(in Norwegian)
 Øyvind Berg in Aftenposten Alex (in Norwegian)

1959 births
Living people
Writers from Oslo
Norwegian dramatists and playwrights
20th-century Norwegian poets
Norwegian male poets
Norwegian male dramatists and playwrights
21st-century Norwegian poets
20th-century Norwegian male writers
21st-century Norwegian male writers